Chachoengsao is one of Thailand's seventy-six  provinces (changwat), located in eastern Thailand.

History
Chachoengsao or Paet Riu ('eight stripes') is a province in eastern Thailand. It has a history dating back to the reign of King Borommatrailokkanat in the mid-Ayutthaya period. People originally settled by the Bang Pakong River and along canals. Chachoengsao, Paet Rio, has a history dating back to the reign of King Borommatrailokkanat in the Ayutthaya period. Most people have settled by the Bang Pakong River and along canals. "Luangpho Phuttha Sothon" is a centre of faith of the people of Paet Rio. In the past, Chachoengsao was a fourth class city under the ministry of defence. During the reign of King Rama I, it was attached to the ministry of the interior. During the reign of King Rama V, who changed the administration system, Chachoengsao became a city in the Prachin Buri Circle. In 1916, its status was changed from a city to a province. "Chacheongsao" is a Chong word which means "deep canal". The name "Paet Rio" comes from the story that the city once teemed with giant snakehead fish; up to eight cuts were required on the sides in the making of sun-dried fish.

Geography

Neighboring provinces are (from north clockwise) Prachinburi, Sa Kaeo, Chanthaburi, Chonburi, Samut Prakan, Bangkok, Pathum Thani, and Nakhon Nayok. It has a short coastline on the Gulf of Thailand.

The western part of the province is the low river plain of the Bang Pa Kong River, which is used extensively for farming rice. To the east is hillier terrain, with an average elevation of more than 100 metres. In Tha Takiap District is the Khao Ang Rue Nai Wildlife Sanctuary with an area of 674,352 rai ~ .

Economy
The province has gained a reputation as a centre for recycling potentially hazardous electronic waste (e-waste), despite a June 2018 ban on imports of foreign e-waste to Thailand. China banned the import of foreign e-waste in 2018 also. Since the e-waste ban, 28 new recycling factories, most dealing with e-waste, have started in Chachoengsao province, particularly in the Ko Khanun Subdistrict of Phanom Sarakham District. In 2019, 14 businesses in Chachoengsao were granted licenses to process electronic waste, six of them in Ko Khanun. An official of the Basel Action Network, which campaigns against dumping waste in poor countries, said, "E-waste has to go somewhere, and the Chinese are simply moving their entire operations to Southeast Asia. The only way to make money is to get huge volume with cheap, illegal labour and pollute the hell out of the environment," he added.

Symbols
The provincial seal shows the main hall of the Sothornvararamvoraviharn Temple. In this hall is the most important Buddha image of the province, known as Luangpho Phutthasothon.

The provincial tree is Peltophorum dasyrachis. The tree was assigned to the province by Queen Sirikit on the 50th anniversary of the coronation of King Rama IX in 2000. The provincial flower is the Yellow Flamboyant (Peltophorum pterocarpum). The provincial fish is the barramundi (Lates calcarifer).

The provincial slogan is "The bountiful Bang Pakong River, the sacred Buddha image of Luangpho Sothon, Phraya Si Sunthon the scholar of Thai language, and the pristine Ang Rue Nai Forest."

Administrative divisions

Provincial government

The province is divided into 11 districts (amphoes). These are further divided into 93 subdistricts (tambons) and 859 villages (mubans).

Local government
As of 26 November 2019 there are: one Chachoengsao Provincial Administration Organisation and 34 municipal (thesaban) areas in the province. Chachoengsao has town (thesaban mueang) status. Further 33 subdistrict municipalities (thesaban tambon). The non-municipal areas are administered by 74 Subdistrict Administrative Organisations - SAO (ongkan borihan suan tambon).

Health 
Chachoengsao's main hospital is Buddhasothorn Hospital, operated by the Ministry of Public Health.

Transport

Chachoengsao's main rail stop is Chachoengsao Junction railway station.

Religion

Human Achievement Index 2017

Since 2003, the United Nations Development Programme (UNDP) in Thailand has tracked progress on human development at the sub-national level using the Human Achievement Index (HAI), a composite index covering eight key areas of human development. The National Economic and Social Development Board (NESDB) has taken over this task since 2017.

References

External links

Flag of Chachoengsao province
Rajabhat Rajanagarindra University

 
Provinces of Thailand
Gulf of Thailand